Biblical cosmology is the biblical writers' conception of the cosmos as an organised, structured entity, including its origin, order, meaning and destiny. The Bible was formed over many centuries, involving many authors, and reflects shifting patterns of religious belief; consequently, its cosmology is not always consistent. Nor do the biblical texts necessarily represent the beliefs of all Jews or Christians at the time they were put into writing: the majority of the texts making up the Hebrew Bible or Old Testament in particular represent the beliefs of only a small segment of the ancient Israelite community, the members of a late Judean religious tradition centered in Jerusalem and devoted to the exclusive worship of Yahweh.

The ancient Israelites usually envisaged the universe as a flat disc-shaped Earth floating on water, heaven above, underworld below. Humans inhabited Earth during life and the underworld after death; there was no way that mortals could enter heaven, and the underworld was morally neutral; only in Hellenistic times (after ) did Jews begin to adopt the Greek idea that it would be a place of punishment for misdeeds, and that the righteous would enjoy an afterlife in heaven. In this period too the older three-level cosmology in large measure gave way to the Greek concept of a spherical Earth suspended in space at the center of a number of concentric heavens.

The opening words of the Genesis creation narrative (Genesis 1:1–26) sum up the biblical editors' view of how the cosmos originated: "In the beginning God created the heavens and the earth"; Yahweh, the God of Israel, was solely responsible for creation and had no rivals, implying Israel's superiority over all other nations.
Later Jewish thinkers, adopting ideas from Greek philosophy, concluded that God's Wisdom, Word and Spirit penetrated all things and gave them unity. Christianity in turn adopted these ideas and identified Jesus with the Logos (Word): "In the beginning was the Word, and the Word was with God, and the Word was God" (John 1:1).

Cosmogony (origins of the cosmos)

Divine battle and divine speech 
Two different models of the process of creation existed in ancient Israel. In the "logos" (speech) model, God speaks and shapes unresisting dormant matter into effective existence and order (Psalm 33: "By the word of YHWH the heavens were made, and by the breath of his mouth all their hosts; he gathers up the waters like a mound, stores the Deep in vaults"); in the second, or "agon" (struggle) model, God does battle with the monsters of the sea at the beginning of the world in order to mark his sovereignty and power. Psalm 74 evokes the agon model: it opens with a lament over God's desertion of his people and their tribulations, then asks him to remember his past deeds: "You it was who smashed Sea with your might, who battered the heads of the monsters in the waters; You it was who crushed the heads of Leviathan, who left them for food for the denizens of the desert..." In this world-view the seas are primordial forces of disorder, and the work of creation is preceded by a divine combat (or "theomachy").

Creation in the "agon" model takes the following storyline: (1) God as the divine warrior battles the monsters of chaos, who include Sea, Death, Tannin and Leviathan; (2)  The world of nature joins in the battle and the chaos-monsters are defeated; (3) God is enthroned on a divine mountain, surrounded by lesser deities; (4) He speaks, and nature brings forth the created world, or for the Greeks, the cosmos. This myth was taken up in later Jewish and Christian apocalyptic literature and projected into the future, so that the cosmic battle becomes the decisive act at the end of the world's history: thus the Book of Revelation (end of the 1st century CE) tells how, after the God's final victory over the sea-monsters, New Heavens and New Earth shall be inaugurated in a cosmos in which there will be "no more sea" (Revelation 21:1).

The Genesis creation narrative (Genesis 1) is the quintessential "logos" creation myth. Like the "agon" model it begins with darkness and the primordial ocean: God separates and restrains the waters, but he does not create them from nothing. God initiates each creative act with a spoken word ("God said, Let there be..."), and finalises it with the giving of a name. Creation by speech is not unique to the Old Testament: it is prominent in some Egyptian traditions. There is, however, a difference between the Egyptian and Hebrew logos mythologies: in Genesis 1 the divine word of the Elohim is an act of "making into"; the word of Egyptian creator-god, by contrast, is an almost magical activation of something inherent in pre-creation: as such, it goes beyond the concept of fiat (divine act) to something more like the Logos of the Gospel of John.

Naming: God, Wisdom, Torah and Christ 
In the ancient world, things did not exist until they were named: "The name of a living being or an object was ... the very essence of what was defined, and the pronouncing of a name was to create what was spoken." The pre-Exilic (before 586 BCE) Old Testament allowed no equals to Yahweh in heaven, despite the continued existence of an assembly of subordinate servant-deities who helped make decisions about matters on heaven and earth. The post-Exilic writers of the Wisdom tradition (e.g. the Book of Proverbs, Song of Songs, etc.) develop the idea that Wisdom, later identified with Torah, existed before creation and was used by God to create the universe: "Present from the beginning, Wisdom assumes the role of master builder while God establishes the heavens, restricts the chaotic waters, and shapes the mountains and fields." Borrowing ideas from Greek philosophers who held that reason bound the universe together, the Wisdom tradition taught that God's Wisdom, Word and Spirit were the ground of cosmic unity. Christianity in turn adopted these ideas and applied them to Jesus: the Epistle to the Colossians calls Jesus "...image of the invisible God, first-born of all creation...", while the Gospel of John identifies him with the creative word ("In the beginning was the Word, and the Word was with God, and the Word was God").

Cosmography (shape and structure of the cosmos)

Heavens, Earth, and underworld
The Hebrew Bible depicted a three-part world, with the heavens (shamayim) above, Earth (eres) in the middle, and the underworld (sheol) below. After the 4th century BCE this was gradually replaced by a Greek scientific cosmology of a spherical Earth surrounded by multiple concentric heavens.

The cosmic ocean 

The three-part world of heavens, Earth and underworld floated in Tehom, the mythological cosmic ocean, which covered the Earth until God created the firmament to divide it into upper and lower portions and reveal the dry land; the world has been protected from the cosmic ocean ever since by the solid dome of the firmament.

The tehom is, or was, hostile to God: it confronted him at the beginning of the world (Psalm 104:6ff) but fled from the dry land at his rebuke; he has now set a boundary or bar for it which it cannot pass (Jeremiah 5:22 and Job 38:8–10). The cosmic sea is the home of monsters which God conquers: "By his power he stilled the sea, by his understanding he smote Rahab!" (Job 26:12f). (Rahab is an exclusively Hebrew sea-monster; others, including Leviathan and the tannin, or dragons, are found in Ugaritic texts; it is not entirely clear whether they are identical with Sea or are Sea's helpers). The "bronze sea" which stood in the forecourt of the Temple in Jerusalem probably corresponds to the "sea" in Babylonian temples, representing the apsu, the cosmic ocean.

In the New Testament Jesus' conquest of the stormy sea shows the conquering deity overwhelming the forces of chaos: a mere word of command from the Son of God stills the foe (Mark 4:35–41), who then tramples over his enemy, (Jesus walking on water - Mark 6:45, 47–51). In Revelation, where the Archangel Michael expels the dragon (Satan) from heaven ("And war broke out in heaven, with Michael and his angels attacking the dragon..." – Revelation 12:7), the motif can be traced back to Leviathan in Israel and to Tiamat, the chaos-ocean, in Babylonian myth, identified with Satan via an interpretation of the serpent in Eden.

Heavens

Form and structure 

In the Old Testament the word shamayim represented both the sky/atmosphere, and the dwelling place of God. The  or firmament – the visible sky – was a solid inverted bowl over the Earth, coloured blue from the heavenly ocean above it. Heaven extended down to and was coterminous with (i.e. it touched) the farthest edges of the Earth (e.g. Deuteronomy 4:32); humans looking up from Earth saw the floor of heaven, which they saw also as God's throne, as made of clear blue lapis-lazuli (Exodus 24:9–10), and (Ezekiel 1:26). Below that was a layer of water, the source of rain, which was separated from us by an impenetrable barrier, the firmament (Genesis 1:6–8). The rain may also be stored in heavenly cisterns (Job: 38:37) or storehouses (Deut 28:12) alongside the storehouses for wind, hail and snow.

Grammatically the word shamayim can be either dual (two) or plural (more than two), without ruling out the singular (one). As a result, it is not clear whether there were one, two, or more heavens in the Old Testament, but most likely there was only one, and phrases such as "heaven of heavens" were meant to stress the vastness of God's realm.

The Babylonians had a more complex idea of heaven, and during the Babylonian exile (6th century BCE) the influence of Babylonian cosmology led to the idea of a plurality of heavens among Jews. This continued into the New Testament: Revelation apparently has only one heaven, but the Epistle to the Hebrews and the epistles to the Colossians and the Ephesians have more than one, although they don't specify how many, and the apostle Paul tells of his visit to the third heaven, the place, according to contemporary thought, where the garden of Paradise is to be found. The reference to the "third heaven" may refer to one of two cosmological systems present in antiquity: one where the cosmos was divided into seven heavens, and the other where the cosmos was divided into three.

God and the heavenly beings

Israel and Judah, like other Canaanite kingdoms, originally had a full pantheon of gods. The chief of the old Canaanite pantheon was the god El, but over time Yahweh replaced him as the national god and the two merged ("Yahweh-El, creator of heaven and earth" – Genesis 14:22). The remaining gods were now subject to Yahweh: "Who in the sky is comparable to Yahweh, like Yahweh among the divine beings? A god dreaded in the Council of holy beings...?" (Psalm 89:6–9). In the Book of Job the Council of Heaven, the Sons of God (bene elohim) meet in heaven to review events on Earth and decide the fate of Job. One of their number is "the Satan", literally "the accuser", who travels over the Earth much like a Persian imperial spy, (Job dates from the period of the Persian empire), reporting on, and testing, the loyalty of men to God.

The heavenly bodies (the heavenly host - Sun, Moon, and stars) were worshiped as deities, a practice which the bible disapproves and of which righteous Job protests his innocence: "If I have looked at the sun when it shone, or the moon ... and my mouth has kissed my hand, this also would be an iniquity..." Belief in the divinity of the heavenly bodies explains a passage in Joshua 10:12, usually translated as Joshua asking the Sun and Moon to stand still, but in fact Joshua utters an incantation to ensure that the sun-god and moon-god, who supported his enemies, would not provide them with oracles.

In the earlier Old Testament texts the bene elohim were gods, but subsequently they became angels, the "messengers" (malakim), whom Jacob sees going up and down a "ladder" (actually a celestial mountain) between heaven and Earth.  In earlier works the messengers were anonymous, but in the Second Temple period (539 BCE–100 CE) they began to be given names, and eventually became the vast angelic orders of Christianity and Judaism. Thus the gods and goddesses who had once been the superiors or equals of Yahweh were first made his peers, then subordinate gods, and finally ended as angels in his service.

Paradise and the human soul 
There is no concept of a human soul, or of eternal life, in the oldest parts of the Old Testament. Death is the going-out of the breath which God once breathed into the dust, all men face the same fate in Sheol, a shadowy existence without knowledge or feeling (Job 14:13; Qoheloth 9:5), and there is no way that mortals can enter heaven. In the centuries after the Babylonian exile, a belief in afterlife and post-death retribution appeared in Jewish apocalyptic literature. At much the same time the Bible was translated into Greek, and the translators used the Greek word paradaisos (Paradise) for the garden of God and Paradise came to be located in heaven.

Earth

Cosmic geography
In the Old Testament period, the Earth was most commonly thought of as a flat disc floating on water. The concept was apparently quite similar to that depicted in a Babylonian world-map from about 600 BCE: a single circular continent bounded by a circular sea, and beyond the sea a number of equally spaced triangles called nagu, "distant regions", apparently islands although possibly mountains. Other OT passages suggest that the sky rests on pillars (Psalm 75:3, 1 Samuel 2:8, Job 9:6), on foundations (Psalms 18:7 and 82:5), or on "supports" (Psalm 104:5). The Book of Job imagines the cosmos as a vast tent, with the Earth as its floor and the sky as the tent itself; from the edges of the sky God hangs the Earth over "nothing", meaning the vast Ocean, securely supported by being tied to the sky (Job 26:7). If the technical means by which Yahweh keeps the earth from sinking into the chaos-waters are unclear, it is nevertheless clear that he does so by virtue of his personal power.

The author of Revelation assumed a flat Earth in Revelation 7:1. The idea that the Earth was a sphere was developed by the Greeks in the 6th century BCE, and by the 3rd century BCE this was generally accepted by educated Romans and Greeks and even by some Jews.

Temples, mountains, gardens and rivers
In the cosmology of the ancient Near East, the cosmic warrior-god, after defeating the powers of chaos, would create the world and build his earthly house, the temple. Just as the abyss, the deepest deep, was the place for Chaos and Death, so God's temple belonged on the high mountain. In ancient Judah the mountain and the location of the Temple was Zion (Jerusalem), the navel and center of the world (Ezekiel 5:5 and 38:12). The Psalms describe God sitting enthroned over the Flood (the cosmic sea) in his heavenly palace (Psalm 29:10), the eternal king who "lays the beams of his upper chambers in the waters" (Psalm 104:3). The Samaritan Pentateuch identifies this mountain as Mount Gerizim, which the New Testament also implicitly acknowledges (John 4:20). This imagery recalls the Mesopotamian god Ea who places his throne in Apsu, the primeval fresh waters beneath the Earth, and the Canaanite god El, described in the Baal cycle as having his palace on a cosmic mountain which is the source of the primordial ocean/water springs.

The point where heavenly and earthly realms join is depicted as an earthly "garden of God", associated with the temple and royal palace. Ezekiel 28:12–19 places the garden in Eden on the mountain of the gods; in Genesis 2–3 Eden's location is more vague, simply far away "in the east", but there is a strong suggestion in both that the garden is attached to a temple or palace. In Jerusalem the earthly Temple was decorated with motifs of the cosmos and the Garden, and, like other ancient near eastern temples, its three sections made up a symbolic microcosm, from the outer court (the visible world of land and sea), through the Holy Place (the visible heaven and the garden of God) to the Holy of Holies (the invisible heaven of God). The imagery of the cosmic mountain and garden of Ezekiel reappears in the New Testament Book of Revelation, applied to the messianic Jerusalem, its walls adorned with precious stones, the "river of the water of life" flowing from under its throne (Revelation 22:1–2).

A stream from underground (a subterranean ocean of fresh water?) fertilises Eden before dividing into four rivers that go out to the entire earth (Genesis 2:5–6); in Ezekiel 47:1–12 (see Ezekiel's Temple) and other prophets the stream issues from the Temple itself, makes the desert bloom, and turns the Dead Sea from salt to fresh. Yet the underground waters are ambiguous: they are the source of life-giving rivers, but they are also associated with death (Jeremiah 2:6 and Job 38:16-17 describe how the way to Sheol is through water, and its gates are located at the foot of the mountain at the bottom of the seas).

Underworld

Sheol and the Old Testament
Beneath the earth is Sheol, the abode of the rephaim (shades), although it is not entirely clear whether all who died became shades, or only the "mighty dead" (compare Psalm 88:10 with Isaiah 14:9 and 26:14). Some biblical passages state that God has no presence in the underworld: "In death there is no remembrance of Thee, in Sheol who shall give Thee thanks?" (Psalm 6). Others imply that the dead themselves are in some sense semi-divine, like the shade of the prophet Samuel, who is called an elohim, the same word used for God and gods. Still other passages state God's power over Sheol as over the rest of his creation: "Tho they (the wicked) dig into Sheol, from there shall my hand take them..." (Amos 9:2).

Intertestamental period

The Old Testament Sheol was simply the home of all the dead, good and bad alike. In the Hellenistic period the Greek-speaking Jews of Egypt, perhaps under the influence of Greek thought, came to believe that the good would not die but would go directly to God, while the wicked would really die and go to the realm of Hades, god of the underworld, where they would perhaps suffer torment. The Book of Enoch, dating from the period between the Old and New Testaments, separates the dead into a well-lit cavern for the righteous and dark caverns for the wicked, and provides the former with a spring, perhaps signifying that these are the "living" (i.e. a spring) waters of life. In the New Testament, Jesus' parable of the rich man and Lazarus reflects the idea that the wicked began their punishment in Hades immediately on dying.

Satan and the end of time

Hades in the New Testament is a temporary holding place, to be used only until the end of time, when its inhabitants will be thrown into the pit of Gehenna or the Lake of Fire (Revelation 20:10–14). This lake is either underground, or will go underground when the "new earth" emerges. The Satan does not inhabit or supervise the underworld – his sphere of activity is the human world – and is only to be thrown into the fire at the end of time. He appears throughout the Old Testament not as God's enemy but as his minister, "a sort of Attorney-General with investigative and disciplinary powers", as in the Book of Job. It was only with the early Church Fathers that he was identified with the serpent in the Garden of Eden and came to be seen as an active rebel against God, seeking to thwart the divine plan for humankind.

See also 

 Allegorical interpretations of Genesis
 Antediluvian
 Babylonian astronomy
 Babylonian cosmology
 Biblical names of stars
 Chronology of the Bible
 Classical planet
 Cosmogony
 Cosmological argument
 Creationist cosmologies
 Flat Earth
 Genesis creation narrative
 Geocentrism
 Hellenistic Judaism
 Jewish eschatology
 List of topics characterized as pseudoscience
 Mandaean cosmology
 Mormon cosmology
 Religious cosmology
 Seven Heavens

References

Bibliography

External links

 
Cosmology
Religious cosmologies
Christian cosmology